Cheetah reintroduction in India involves the attempt to introduce and sustain a small population of Southeast African cheetah (Acinonyx jubatus jubatus, the nominate subspecies) in India more than 70 years after India's native subspecies, the Asiatic cheetah (Acinonyx jubatus venaticus)  became extinct there; the Asiatic subspecies is now found only in Iran in critically endangered numbers.

The Asiatic cheetah whose long history on the Indian subcontinent gave the Sanskrit-derived vernacular name "cheetah", or "spotted", to the entire species,  Acinonyx jubatus, also had a gradual history of habitat loss there. In Punjab, before the thorn forests were cleared and extensively utilized for agriculture and human settlement,  they were intermixed with open grasslands grazed by large herds of blackbuck; these co-existed with their main natural predator, the Asiatic cheetah.  The blackbuck is no longer extant in Punjab. Later, more habitat loss, prey depletion, and trophy-hunting were to lead to the extinction of the Asiatic cheetah in other regions of India.

Discussions on cheetah reintroduction in India began soon after extinction was confirmed, in the mid-1950s. Proposals were made to the governments of Iran from the 1970s, but fell through chiefly for reasons of political instability there. Offers from Kenya for introducing African cheetahs were made as early as the 1980s. Proposals for the introduction of African cheetahs were made by the Indian government in 2009, but disallowed by India's supreme court. The court reversed its decision in early 2020, allowing the import of a small number, on an experimental basis for testing long-term adaptation. On 17 September 2022, five female and three male southeast African cheetahs, between the ages of four and six (a gift from the government of Namibia), were released in a small quarantined enclosure within the Kuno National Park in the state of Madhya Pradesh. The cheetahs, all fitted with radio collars, will remain in the quarantined enclosure for a month; initially, the males (and later the females) will be released into the  park. The relocation has been supervised by Yadvendradev V. Jhala of the Wildlife Institute of India and zoologist Laurie Marker, of the Namibia-based Cheetah Conservation Fund. Subsequently, 12 cheetahs from South Africa will be released in Kuno;   eventually, the total number of African cheetahs in Kuno will be brought up to 40 individuals.

The scientific reaction to the translocation has been mixed. Adrian Tordiffe (a wildlife veterinary pharmacologist at the University of Pretoria who will be supervising the release of the cheetahs) is an enthusiast,  who views India as providing "protected space" for the fragmented and threatened population of the world's cheetahs.  K. Ullas Karanth, one of India's tiger experts, has been critical of the effort, considering it to be a "PR exercise." India's "realities", he says, such as human overpopulation, and the presence of larger feline predators and packs of feral dogs, could all cause potentially "high mortalities," and require a continual import of African cheetahs. Kuno National Park is a relatively new national park, having received that status in 2018. It had been founded previously as a wildlife sanctuary to implement the Asiatic Lion Reintroduction Project, which aimed to establish a second Asiatic lion population in India. The goal was to protect the isolated lions of the Gir National Park (in Gujarat) from a potential mass mortality event, set off by the outbreak of an epizootic. Although the state government of Gujarat was ordered by India's Supreme Court in April 2013 to transfer a small population of lions from Gujarat to Kuno, and was given six months to complete the transfer, they ultimately  resisted implementing the order.

Background

History

Until the 20th century, the Asiatic cheetah was quite common and roamed all across the Middle East, from the Arabian Peninsula to Iran, Afghanistan and India. In India, they ranged as far south as the Tirunelveli district of Tamil Nadu. The Asiatic cheetah, also known as the "hunting leopard" in India was kept by kings and princes to hunt gazelle and blackbucks. Firuz Shah Tughluq is considered to be the first ruler in medieval times to tame cheetahs for hunting purposes. The Mughal emperor Akbar had around 1000 Cheetahs for hunting gazelle and blackbucks.

In 1608, a white cheetah was known to be in possession of Raja Vir Singh Deo in Orchha. Mughal king Jahangir describes its spots to be of blue colour in his book Tuzuk-i Jahangiri. This is said to be the only recorded white cheetah. French traveller Jean de Thévenot mentions in his chronicles during the reign of Aurangzeb that only the provincial governors were allowed to trap and rear Cheetahs in captivity  Trapping of large numbers of adult Indian cheetahs, who had already learned hunting skills from wild mothers, for assisting in royal hunts is said to be another major cause of the species rapid decline in India as they never bred in captivity with only one record of a litter ever.

Fewer number of trophy hunting reports at the end of British Rule in India compared to initial years points out to already dwindling population of Cheetahs. A research found at least 230 cheetahs still existed in wild since 1799.

Extinction

By the beginning of the twentieth century, the species was already heading for extinction in many areas. There were certain places more affected by this problem than others. The Indian reserves were not very thoughtful when creating habitat loss for these oversized cats. The last physical evidence of the Asiatic cheetah in India was thought to be three, all shot by the Maharajah Ramanuj Pratap Singh Deo of Surguja State in 1948, in eastern Madhya Pradesh or northern Chhattisgarh, but a female was sighted in Koriya district, in what is now Chhattisgarh, in 1951.

In India in the mid-20th century, prey was abundant, and cheetahs fed on the blackbuck, the chinkara, and sometimes the chital and the nilgai.

With the death of the last remaining population of the Asiatic cheetah in India, the species was declared extinct in India; it is the only animal in recorded history to become extinct from India due to unnatural causes. A consequence of the extinction of the cheetahs and subsequently the Indian royalty that prized them was that their grasslands homes came to be controlled, used and managed by local people. "The grasslands faded and diminished under the hooves of a thousand cattle, they were tilled and ploughed until only a few scattered remnants were preserved in the form of wildlife sanctuaries".

Early efforts 
The debate over whether cheetah reintroduction was compatible with the stated aims of wildlife conservation, started soon after extinction was confirmed. As far back as 1955, the former State Wildlife Board of Andhra Pradesh suggested the reintroduction of the Asiatic cheetah in at least in two districts of the state, on an experimental basis. In 1965, the pros and cons of reintroduction were critically discussed by M. Krishnan in a newspaper article. In 1984, Divyabhanusinh was asked to write a paper on the status of cheetah in India for the Ministry of Environment and Forests.  This paper was subsequently sent to the Cat Specialist Group of Species Survival Commission of the IUCN, where it sparked international interest.

Sourcing from Iran 
In the 1970s, the Department of Environment formally wrote to the Iranian government to request Asiatic cheetahs in use for reintroduction and apparently received a positive response. The talks were stalled after the Shah of Iran was deposed in the Iranian Revolution, and the negotiations never progressed.

In August 2009, Jairam Ramesh, the then-Minister of Environment, reportedly rekindled the talks with Iran for sharing a few of their animals. Iran had always been hesitant to commit to the idea, given the very low numbers present in the country. It is said that Iran wanted an Asiatic lion in exchange for a cheetah, and that India was not willing to export any of its lions. The plan to source cheetahs from Iran was eventually dropped in 2010.

Sourcing from Africa 
Offers by the Kenyan government to send cheetahs to India were reported as far back as the 1980s. In 2009, the report by Wildlife Institute of India recommended sourcing cheetahs from Africa.

Cloning 
During the early 2000s, Indian scientists from the Centre for Cellular and Molecular Biology (CCMB), Hyderabad, proposed a plan to clone Asiatic cheetahs obtained from Iran. The idea of cloning was introduced by the people concerned with their population, which were few. India requested Iran to transport one live pair to India. If not possible, Indian scientists requested Iran to allow them to collect some live cells of the cheetah pair in Iran itself, which can then be made into living cell lines. They planned to use the nucleus from these cells to manually reproduce their own cheetahs, over a significantly long amount of time.

Reintroduction plan 
In September 2009, the cheetah reintroduction plan made significant progress when the Ministry of Environment & Forests, through the Wildlife Institute of India (WII), organized a meeting in Gajner, Rajasthan, to discuss the issue. The meeting was jointly organised by the WII in association with the Wildlife Trust of India (WTI), a prominent NGO based in Delhi. The Cheetah Conservation Fund, IUCN and other NGOs were represented as were high-ranking officials of several State Forest Departments. Minister Jairam Ramesh approved the recommendation for a detailed survey of seven potential reintroduction sites (and three holding sites for captive breeding) in four states, shortlisted during the Gajner consultative meeting. In January 2022, environment minister Bhupender Yadav launched the action plan for reintroducing cheetahs in India, with an emphasis to Kuno National Park.

Introduction of African cheetah 
Since the Asiatic cheetah was extirpated from India in 1952, plans to reestablish the cheetah in India have been ongoing. For this purpose, a meeting of cheetah experts was organised at Gajner in the Indian state of Rajasthan in September 2009. 
Laurie Marker of the Cheetah Conservation Fund, Stephen J. O'Brien, and other cheetah experts argued for the introduction of the Southeast African cheetah as the Asiatic cheetah survives only in Iran, its population numbers less than 100 individuals, and the Iranian government's repeated reluctance to supply said cheetahs for Indian efforts. The meeting also identified Namibia, South Africa, Botswana, Kenya, Tanzania, and the UAE as countries from where the cheetah could be imported to India. "About 5 to 10 animals annually have to be brought to India over a period of 5 to 10 years," recommended another working group, which was formed for exploring sourcing and translocation of the cheetah.

The Ministry of Environment & Forests approved the recommendation for a detailed survey of potential reintroduction sites in the Indian states of Rajasthan, Gujarat, Madhya Pradesh, and Chhattisgarh, which were shortlisted during the consultative meeting. Four more Indian states; Tamilnadu, Karnataka, Andhra Pradesh, and Maharashtra were also considered. The survey would have formed the basis for the roadmap of reintroduction of cheetahs in India, and would have been carried out by the Wildlife Institute of India (WII).

Possible reintroduction sites 
A research team led by WII and WTI shortlisted three regions which have the potential to support cheetah populations. The Nauradehi Wildlife Sanctuary and Kuno-Palpur Wildlife Sanctuaries in Madhya Pradesh and the Shahgarh bulge landscape in Jaisalmer, Rajasthan have been found potentially suitable for the reintroduction of the cheetah. The Kuno-Palpur Wildlife Sanctuary in Madhya Pradesh has the potential to hold populations of four of India's big cats; the Bengal tiger, Indian leopard, Asiatic lion, and Asiatic cheetah, all four of which have co-existed in the same habitats historically for many years, before they were wiped out, in part or in whole, due to overhunting and habitat destruction. Since the Shahgarh Landscape is fenced along the Indo-Pakistani border region, the addition of more fencing will ensure adequate protection for the cheetah population. The Nauradehi Wildlife Sanctuary (1197km2) is part of a much larger savanna landscape (5500 km2) which can host the cheetah as well.

At a future date, when sufficient population has built up, other former range habitats in India (after revitalizing them) may also be considered for reintroduction like the Banni grasslands and Desert National Park etc.

A few wildlife groups have suggested the Moyar River valley in Tamil Nadu's Satyamangalam FD, part of Nilgiri Biosphere Reserve as it is a pristine forest with flourishing population of prey and a good record of conservation. Frederick Augustus Nicholson, the then British Collector has reported to have shot a few individuals near Kothamangalam, Velamundi and Bolampatti (all in NBR).

Concerns

Genetic subspecies level differentiation 

The Asiatic cheetah (Acinonyx jubatus venaticus) has, for a long time, been classified as a subspecies of the cheetah. However, at a cheetah reintroduction workshop organised in India on 9 September 2009, Stephen J. O'Brien from the Laboratory of Genomic Diversity of National Cancer Institute of the United States said that according to the latest genetic studies, the Asiatic cheetah was, in fact, genetically identical to the African cheetah with which it had separated only 5,000 years ago. This was not enough time for a subspecies level differentiation; O'Brien said that in comparison the Asiatic and African lion subspecies were separated some 100,000 years ago, and African and Asian leopard subspecies about 169,000 years ago.

Subsequently, in 2011, a much more detailed five-year genetic study involving gathering of DNA samples from the wild, zoos and museums in eight countries was published in Molecular Ecology on 8 January 2011. This newer study concluded that African and Asiatic cheetahs were genetically distinct and separated 32,000 to 67,000 years ago. Subspecies level differentiation had taken place due to longer separation from the African population.

Genetic studies published in 2020 indicate divergences between Asiatic and African subspecies are more prominent than previously recognized.

Current status
The Ministry of forests and environment of India is now hammering out the details of the cheetah conservation plan. As a first step, a two-day seminar of technical experts on cheetahs was held in Gajner from 9 September 2009. Experts on cheetah, including Divyabhanusinh Chavda and M K Ranjitsinh presented their papers on how to go about bringing cheetahs to India.

The initial plans were to bring the cheetahs to Gajner Wildlife Sanctuary. "We want to set up a breeding ground for the cheetahs and Gajner seems to fit the bill perfectly. Thereafter, they will be transported to various states," he added.

India is also in talks with the Islamic Republic of Iran over the possibility of sending a pair of Asiatic cheetahs to India. The Iranian embassy in Delhi said that its government was in the process of "arranging" talks.

The Union Minister of State for Environment and Forests Jairam Ramesh said that African cheetahs could be brought to India within three years having just returned from a trip to South Africa, one of the potential source-habitats of cheetahs to be moved to India.

The Wildlife Institute of India is spearheading the project, and will unveil a road map and destination for the African cheetahs – possible options are in Rajasthan, Madhya Pradesh and Gujarat – by the end of May.

Kuno Palpur and Nauradehi Sanctuary in Madhya Pradesh and Shahgarh landscape in Jaisalmer in Rajasthan have been selected in by the Wildlife Institute of India as most suitable sites for the reintroduction project.

In May 2012 the Indian Supreme Court had put the project of importing cheetahs from Africa and reintroducing them in India on hold. Some Conservationists have been fighting a legal battle in Indian Supreme Court to get the Indian State Government of Gujarat to break its monopolizing of wild Asiatic lions and release a few overpopulated prides of lions spilling out of Gir National Park for reintroduction in the Kuno Wildlife Sanctuary in the neighbouring Indian State of Madhya Pradesh which was prepared for them after relocating over 24 villages out of the forest. In the past, for last two decades the State Government of Gujarat had concocted every possible reason to maintain its monopoly on wild Asiatic lions and the tourism revenue generated by them and of recent Gujarat's legal council had put forward the argument that Kuno Wildlife Sanctuary is being used for the introduction of African cheetah which might take several years to fully settle down and repopulate the area and hence reintroduction of lions should only be done after that, this scared the conservationists that Gujarat will use this pretext to delay the reintroduction of native lions by many more decades using the cheetah argument. Indian Supreme court has taken note of the arguments put forth by some Indian conservationists that importing African cheetah for reintroduction in India is misguided as it is against the International Union for Conservation of Nature's reintroduction guidelines and no clearance had been sought from India's National Board for Wildlife. The Indian Supreme Court has fast tracked the case for the re-introduction of lions to Kuno Wildlife Sanctuary and is hearing it every Monday.

Senior advocate PS Narasimha, court-appointed adviser and the amicus curiae in the Asiatic lion's relocation case in India's Supreme Court, filed an application seeking a stay on the implementation of African cheetah reintroduction project in India. The Indian Supreme court had granted the stay and the matter has been scheduled for further hearing in July 2012 after the court returns from vacation. During its hearings, the Bench was informed that India's Ministry of Environment and Forests (MoEF) has decided to introduce the Southern African cheetah (Acinonyx jubatus jubatus) from Namibia into Kuno Wildlife Sanctuary in the Indian state of Madhya Pradesh, the same proposed habitat being developed as the second home for the translocation of lions from Gir Wildlife Sanctuary in the neighbouring Indian state of Gujarat which did not want to shift any lions out of the state. Narasimha said the proposal for reintroduction of African cheetah "has not been either placed before the Standing Committee of India's National Board for Wildlife, nor has there been a considered decision taken in this regard". He stated in an application that "scientific studies show that the African cheetahs and Asian Cheetahs are completely different, both genetically and also in their characteristics" and the reintroduction of African cheetah in India was also against the International Union for the Conservation of Nature (IUCN) guidelines on translocation of wildlife species. "In fact, the (IUCN) guidelines categorically warn against the introduction of alien or exotic species. The African Cheetah obviously never existed in India. Therefore, it is not case of intentional movement of an organism into a part of its native range," the application stated. Asiatic cheetah became extinct in India in the 1950s, In the past, India's last recorded cheetah in the wild was said to have been shot in the Rewa area of Madhya Pradesh in the late 1940s. It was mentioned that the introduction of alien or exotic species is universally shunned by wildlife experts and "in fact countries such as South Africa, Australia are spending huge amount of funds to eradicate and remove exotic wildlife species from wilderness areas or wild habitats". Narasimha also sought a direction of India's Ministry of Environment and Forests (MoEF) to produce before the apex court all relevant records and decisions relating to introduction of cheetah. He said the Indian cheetah in genetic composition is a different animal than the African cheetah and a different subspecies altogether and "therefore one cannot be introduced in place of the other". Conservationists say no more than 50 of the critically endangered Asiatic cheetah remain only in Iran, roaming the central deserts. The vast majority of the 7,000 cheetahs left in the world are in Africa.

On 28 January 2020, the Supreme Court allowed the central government to introduce Southern African cheetahs to a suitable habitat in India as part of a trial to see if they can adapt. The ruling came in response to an application filed by the National Tiger Conservation Authority (NTCA) seeking permission to introduce Southern African cheetahs from Namibia. The Supreme Court set up a three-member committee to guide the NTCA and asked the committee to submit a progress report every four months. Subsequently, a scientific assessment of all potential reintroduction sites was conducted to understand the habitat conditions, prey species availability, protection status and other ecological criteria for shortlisting initial introduction site. A detailed scientific action plan was published by WII and NTCA in January 2022.

In August 2022, the Union Cabinet Minister of Labour and Employment and Environment, Forest and Climate Change, Bhupender Yadav stated that African cheetahs will be reintroduced to Kuno Wildlife Sanctuary in September. Yadav also stated that 8 cheetahs are being expected to come from Namibia. The Indian Government is also attempting to translocate another 12 cheetahs from South Africa to India.

On 17 September 2022, 8 cheetahs from Namibia arrived in Madhya Pradesh's Kuno National Park, where they were released as part of the programme to reintroduce the feline in India. Out of the 8 cheetahs, 5 are female and 3 are male.  In November 2022, 2 male cheetahs were shifted to a larger enclosure for further adaption after their mandatory quarantine. Later in November 2022, another male cheetah was released into the larger enclosure and on 28 November 2022, 2 female cheetahs were also shifted to the enclosure. The released cheetah were reported to prey on the available herbivores including the chital (Axis axis).

In January 2023, South Africa signed an agreement with India to reintroduce cheetahs in India, and the country will relocate a first batch of 12 cheetahs to India in February 2023. In addition to this, the agreement between both countries also involves South Africa relocating a further 12 cheetahs every year for the next 8 to 10 years.

Ongoing reintroduction at Kuno National Park 
On 11 March 2023, a breeding pair, named Oban and Aasha, were released together into the wild of Kuno National Park in Madhya Pradesh, India. The reintroduced cheetahs are confirmed to have successfully hunted prey in the park. More cheetahs are planned to be released in the coming days. The released cheetahs are being tracked by radio collars.

Gallery

See also 

Wildlife of India
List of mammals of India

References

Further reading
Assessing the potential for reintroducing the cheetah in India, 2010. A report on the feasibility of cheetah reintroduction in India prepared by the Wildlife Institute of India (WII), and submitted to the Ministry of Environment and Forests, Government of India (Ranjitsinh, M. K. & Jhala, Y. V. (2010) Assessing the potential for reintroducing the cheetah in India. Also available at WII website: , . Accessed 1 Feb 2011. Also available at Ministry of Environment and Forests (India) website:  Accessed 20 Sept 2011.
Project Cheetah (Brochure), September 2010, Ministry of Environment and Forests, Government of India. Accessed 1 Feb 2011.
Return Of The Cheetah?; October 2010; Sanctuary Asia magazine; India. Accessed 1 Feb 2011.
Spotted: Lean Cat Rerun; Hunted out from Indian grasslands, the cheetah may tear across the landscape again; Shruti Ravindran; 5 October 2009; outlookindia magazine. Accessed 1 Feb 2011.

External links
 Reintroducing the Cheetah in India
 Video of Indian Cheetah being used for hunting Blackbuck, 1939
 Video on Youtube: India Cheetah Re-introduction. Uploaded by ccfcheetah on 19 January 2012; The Cheetah Conservation Fund has been working on and advisory capacity with the Wildlife Trust of India and India's authorities to discuss the best strategies for re-introducing cheetahs in India. For more information visit www.cheetah.org
Video on Youtube: Movie 'Cheetahs in Iran; the last stronghold of the Asiatic cheetah. Uploaded by kohvasang on 31 October 2011. this movie shows how they find the cheetahs in desert of iran. A video report which shows how Iranians and an international team cooperate to save scattered Cheetahs in Iran.

 
Mammals of India
Wildlife conservation in India
Animal reintroduction
Conservation-reliant species
Fauna of Rajasthan